Budding is the formation of a new organism by the protrusion of part of another organism.

Budding may also refer to:
Production of buds by plants
Apocrine secretion from cells
Budding (grafting), a technique for propagating plants such as fruit trees
Shield budding, a method used for tree budding
Budding (surname)

See also

Bud (disambiguation)